The Frightened City is a 1961 British neo-noir gangster film about extortion rackets and gang warfare in the West End of London. It stars Herbert Lom, John Gregson and a pre-Bond Sean Connery, who plays a burglar called Paddy Damion. He is lured into a protection racket by oily mobster Harry Foulcher (Alfred Marks), in order to support his partner in crime Wally Smith (Kenneth Griffith), who is injured in a robbery.

Although Connery's character has a girlfriend, he seduces the beautiful Anya (Yvonne Romain), the mistress of the seedy and sinister crime boss Zhernikov (Herbert Lom). John Gregson plays Detective Inspector Sayers who is dedicated to tackling organised crime.

The Shadows had a hit single, no. 3 on the British charts in May 1961, with the main theme.  It was subsequently covered by Peter Frampton in the 1996 collection Twang!: A Tribute to Hank Marvin & the Shadows.

Cast

 Herbert Lom as Waldo Zhernikov
 John Gregson as Detective Inspector Sayers
 Sean Connery as Paddy Damion
 Alfred Marks as Harry Foulcher
 Yvonne Romain as Anya Bergodin
 Olive McFarland as Sadie
 Frederick Piper as Sergeant Bob Ogle
 John Stone as Hood
 David Davies as Alf Peters
 Tom Bowman as Tanky Thomas
 Robert Cawdron as Nero
 George Pastell as Sanchetti
 Patrick Holt as Superintendent Dave Carter
 Martin Wyldeck as Security Officer
 Kenneth Griffith as Wally Smith
 Bruce Seton as Assistant Commissioner

Production
Filming started 5 December 1960.

Release

The London premiere of “The Frightened City” took place at the Odeon Marble Arch on 9 August 1961.

Critical reception
In a contemporary review, Variety described it as "a conventional but brisk gangster yarn," concluding that "Herbert Lom plays the brains of the crooked organization with urbane villainy and equally reliable John Gregson makes a solid, confident job of the dedicated cop. Alfred Marks is cast offbeat as Lom’s gangster lieutenant. Marks gives a rich, oily, sinister and yet often amusing portrayal of an ambitious thug who is prepared to turn killer to get his own way. Comparative newcomer, rugged Sean Connery makes a distinct impression as an Irish crook, with an eye for the ladies. Connery combines toughness, charm and Irish blarney." According to a review on the AllMovie website: "The film itself is only of moderate interest, a gangster thriller that's engaging but not special; but the cast makes it worth watching."

References

External links

1961 films
1961 crime drama films
Allied Artists films
British crime drama films
British gangster films
Films directed by John Lemont
Films set in London
British neo-noir films
1960s English-language films
1960s British films